Clyde River is a waterway on the eastern coast of Baffin Island in the Qikiqtaaluk Region of Nunavut, Canada.

Geography
The river outflows from Generator Lake at the southeastern end of Barnes Ice Cap in the Baffin Mountains. It flows in a roughly northeastern direction before reaching the head of Clyde Fiord in Kangiqtugaapik, Baffin Bay.

See also
List of rivers of Nunavut
Geography of Nunavut

References

Rivers of Qikiqtaaluk Region